William Presley Baker (February 22, 1911 – August 13, 2006) was an American professional baseball player, coach and umpire. The catcher appeared in seven seasons in Major League Baseball for  the Cincinnati Reds (–), Pittsburgh Pirates (–) and St. Louis Cardinals (–). He played baseball and football at Boyden High School in Salisbury, North Carolina.

Baker was a .247 hitter with 145 hits, 25 doubles, five triples, two home runs and 68 RBI in 263 games played. During his career as a backup catcher in the National League, he was a member of the 1940 World Champion Cincinnati Reds. His most productive year was 1943, with Pittsburgh, when he appeared in a career-high 63 games and hit .273 with 26 RBI. Traded to St. Louis, he batted .294 in 45 games in 1948.

Following his playing career, he coached under Frankie Frisch, his old Pittsburgh manager, with the  Chicago Cubs, then became an umpire in the minor leagues.

Bill Baker died in Myrtle Beach, South Carolina, at the age of 95.

References

External links

Baseball Almanac
Retrosheet

1911 births
2006 deaths
American Presbyterians
Baseball coaches from North Carolina
Baseball players from North Carolina
Chicago Cubs coaches
Cincinnati Reds players
Columbus Red Birds players
Greensboro Patriots players
Indianapolis Indians players
Little Rock Travelers players
Major League Baseball catchers
Major League Baseball umpires
Monroe Twins players
Nashville Vols players
Newark Bears players
Oakland Oaks (baseball) players
People from Granite Quarry, North Carolina
People from Mecklenburg County, North Carolina
People from Rowan County, North Carolina
Pittsburgh Pirates players
Salisbury High School (North Carolina) alumni
St. Louis Cardinals players
Syracuse Chiefs players
Williamsport Grays players